Bagdad is a former settlement and mining camp in Butte County, California, United States. Gold was discovered at Bagdad by A.G. Simpson.

Several mines operated at Bagdad, including the War Eagle Mine and the Orange Blossom Mines.

References

Former settlements in Butte County, California
Former populated places in California